The BUGA Wood Pavilion (also known as BUGA Holzpavillion) is a  experimental shell structure that served as an open event space with a multi-purpose stage at the Bundesgartenschau 2019 in Heilbronn.

Description 
The Buga Wood Pavilion is one of two research demonstrator buildings that were constructed on the summer island at the National Horticultural Show 2019 in Heilbronn. The segmented hollow cassette structure is inspired by the skeleton of the sanddollar and was entirely digitally designed. 
The pavilion was robotically prefabricated with a distributed robotics platform at a local carpentry and  assembled on site within 10 days.

References 

Buildings and structures in Heilbronn
Wooden buildings and structures in Germany